Donald Joseph Gutteridge (June 19, 1912 – September 7, 2008) was an American infielder, coach, manager and scout in Major League Baseball. Primarily a second baseman and third baseman, he was a member of the St. Louis Cardinals, St. Louis Browns, Boston Red Sox and Pittsburgh Pirates over 12 seasons between 1936 and 1948, and later managed the Chicago White Sox in 1969–1970. He was the regular second baseman of the 1944 Browns, the only St. Louis entry to win an American League pennant.

Born in Pittsburg, Kansas, Gutteridge was a first cousin of MLB catcher Ray Mueller. After entering pro ball in 1932, Gutteridge played his first game for the Cardinals at age 24, and in only his fifth career major league game hit two home runs in the first game of a doubleheader on September 11, 1936, including an inside-the-park home run and one steal of home plate. Over the course of his career, he was an average hitter with excellent speed and fielding ability; he turned five double plays in a game in  during the Browns' long pennant-winning season.

In 1,151 games over 12 seasons, Gutteridge compiled a .256 batting average (1,075-for-4,202) with 586 runs, 200 doubles, 64 triples, 39 home runs, 95 stolen bases, 309 base on balls, 444 strikeouts, .308 on-base percentage and .362 slugging percentage. Defensively, he recorded a .956 fielding percentage. In the 1944 and 1946 World Series, covering nine games, he batted .192. (five-for-26).

Before his contract obtained by the Red Sox on July 9, 1946, Gutteridge had been the player-manager of the Browns' top farm club, the Toledo Mud Hens of the Triple-A American Association. He resumed his managerial career in 1951, then coached for the White Sox for over a decade (1955–1966 and 1968–1969), including the  pennant-winning team. In 1969, he succeeded Al López as manager on May 3. He led Chicago to a fifth-place finish in the AL West that season. With the White Sox record a major league-worst 49–87, Gutteridge requested and was granted a release from his contract on September 2, 1970 after being informed by general manager Stu Holcomb that he would not be retained for 1971. He was succeeded on an interim basis by Bill Adair. Gutteridge's record over those two partial seasons was 109–172 (.388).

He later was a long-time scout for the Kansas City Royals, New York Yankees and Los Angeles Dodgers.

Don Gutteridge died on September 7, 2008, in his hometown of Pittsburg after contracting pneumonia. At the time of his death, Gutteridge was the oldest living former manager or coach in Major League Baseball. He was also the last living member of the St. Louis Browns who played in the 1944 World Series—the franchise's only Fall Classic.

Managerial record

References

External links

 

1912 births
2008 deaths
Baseball coaches from Kansas
Baseball players from Kansas
Boston Red Sox players
Chicago White Sox coaches
Chicago White Sox managers
Colorado Springs Sky Sox managers
Columbus Red Birds players
Houston Buffaloes players
Indianapolis Indians managers
Indianapolis Indians players
Kansas City Royals scouts
Lincoln Links players
Los Angeles Dodgers scouts
Major League Baseball second basemen
Major League Baseball first base coaches
New York Yankees scouts
People from Pittsburg, Kansas
Pittsburgh Pirates players
Pittsburg State Gorillas baseball players
Sacramento Solons players
St. Louis Browns players
St. Louis Cardinals players
Toledo Mud Hens managers
Toledo Mud Hens players